Ujung Blang beach  is one of a famous beach in Lhokseumawe. Ujung Blang beach stretch of the river estuary Cunda (kuala cangkoi) covering four region namely Ujung Blang village, Ulee Jalan village, Hagu Barat Laut village, and Hagu Tengah village.

Ujung Blang beach is named after the village where the beach is located. Meaning "Sawan Blang" own in Aceh is "convulsions" ends and means "Blang" means or stretch of farm fields. Because at first, Lhokseumawe region consists of acreage of rice fields, marshes, and vacant land.

Sunrise view in this beach has its own nuances. Visitors are presented a view of the fishing activity a day - a day.

External links 
  Bappeda Kota Lhokseumawe
  Government Lhokseumawe
  Facebook Link Kota Lhokseumawe

Beaches of Indonesia